Partition alignment is the proper alignment of partitions to the boundaries available in a data storage device.

Examples include the following:
 4 KB sector alignment with hard disk drives supporting Advanced Format (AF)
 Track partition alignment, partitions starting on track boundaries on hard disk drives
 Cylinder partition alignment, partitions starting on logical or physical cylinder boundaries on hard disk drives
 SSD page partition alignment, partitions starting on NVM page boundaries (with pages typically 4 to 16 KB in size) on SSDs and other flash-based memory devices
 SSD block partition alignment, partitions starting on NVM block boundaries (typically blocks of 128 to 512 pages) on SSDs and other flash-based memory devices
 1 MB partition alignment, partitions starting on 1 MB boundaries
 RAID stripe alignment, partition alignment based on stripe boundaries

See also 
 Advanced Format
 Data striping